Choi Yu-ree (Hangul: 최유리, born November 24, 1998), is a South Korean singer-songwriter. Choi is known as winner of the 29th Yoo Jae-ha Music Contest (2018) and 23rd CJ Azit TuneUp Musicians. Her most famous single is Wish, original soundtrack of Netflix Original Series Hometown Cha-Cha-Cha (2021).

Early life and education
Choi was born on November 24, 1998, in Pyeongchang, Gangwon-do, South Korea and raised there. Choi went to a piano academy since she was little and naturally singing while playing the piano. She was in humanities class in Pyeongchang High School. When she was in her third year of high school, her mother suggested that she go to music university. Choi entered an entrance exam cram school and learned jazz piano and music theory. Choi moved to Seoul when She was accepted in Department of Applied Music of Donga University of the Arts. She graduated with Bachelor in Composition Major.

Career

2017–2020: Career beginnings 
In 2018 Choi compete on the 29th Yoo Jae-ha Music Contest. This competitionis is called the 'star making' due to its success launch career of many accomplished musicians such as Bang Si-hyuk, Yoo Hee-Yeol, Kim Yeon-woo, Jo Kyu-chan, and Sweet Sorrow. Winning a daesang (grand prize) with her self-written piece "Complaint", jump-started her career as a singer-songwriter.

On June 1, 2019, "Complaint" was released as main song in the 29th Yoo Jae-ha Music Contest Album. She was only 22 years old when winning this big award, so the music industry saw Choi as one of the best prospects in the pop and indie music market.

In the same year, Choi signed with Shofar Music as a solo artist. Choi chose this label because She used to perform regularly at 'Café Shofar' since her first year of college. Every Friday evening, acoustic performances by musicians have been held at Café Shofar, run by artist-type label Shofar Music. More than 100 teams of musicians have participated in this event. On October 24, 2019, her song "Regret" was released as title track of the compilation album 'In Bloom' Cafe Chopard Compilation Vol.1. In the album, Choi became representative of 'Café Shofar' musicians, along with three bands, Electric Mattress, Yirang and Dali. In 2019, Choi featured on fellow indie singer-songwriter Seong In-chang’ song "Letter" (편지).

In the beginning of 2020, Choi took part in Shofar musicians collaboration singles "Awkward". It was released on January 9, 2020, as title track of album Shofar Music Compilation Vol.3, Awkward relationship.

2020: Official debut 
On February 24, 2020, Choi made her official debut with the release of her first extended play (EP) Shape. Composed of a total of six songs, Shape is an work that attempts various genres with the theme of Choi's daily thoughts and actions. The title track Shape is a ballad that mixes popular melodies with traditional indie music style. Two other songs, "Warm-hearted" and "Stay" are harmonization of folk and pop music, and 'Asking everyday' is a pop song with jazzy sensibility. Her song from previously released omnibus albums "Regret" and acoustic song "Complaint" were also included.

The title song 'Circle' was released by Yuri Choi through SoundCloud, and many music fans requested an official sound source. After the release of this album, Yuri Choi, who said that her fans responded enthusiastically, said with a smile, "I wondered if her fans had waited this long."

On the November 9, 2021, IU recommended two songs from Shape via her official Instagram Story. IU was posting a warm message saying, "Please warm up your heart and go" alongside a streaming proof shot of tracks, "Warm-hearted" and "Stay" This sparked curiosity from many IU’ fans into streaming both songs and they became viral on SoundCloud. Choi uploaded a screenshot to her Instagram story along with the message, "Clear love to all of you who like it," and thanked the fans and IU.

On June 4, 2020, Choi released his first digital single "Home", an indie/folk genre song that expresses the warmth of memories of her neighborhood. Few months later, on September 20, 2020, her second digital single "Reply" was released.

Choi released her second extended play (EP), "Only Us" on December 15, 2021. The album contains a total of six songs, including the title track of the same name as her album. EP), "Only Us" is a song that expresses the wish that no matter what wounds or painful things happen, we would like to stay here as free as we are. She added that it was also a song that runs through the theme of the album. In addition, the album contains four new songs including 'Pond', 'Old Rain' and 'Talk to Myself'. "Home" and "Reply", which were released as singles in June and September respectively, were also included in the album.

2021–present: Muse On, first solo concert, CJ Azit TuneUp and Original soundtracks 
On April 13, 2021, Choi released her third extended play (EP), "Two". This album contains a total of five songs, including the title track "Two". The other four songs are "Still", "Catch the Tag", "Fly" and "Love".

Choi Yu-ree’ first solo concert Prologue was held at Sangsang Madang Live Hall in Hongdae, Seoul on May 15 and 16, 2021. Ticket power was high because all tickets were sold out at the same time as the tickets opened at 6 pm KST on April 19, 2021.

In July 2021, Choi was selected as one of 15 Musician of the Year of ‘Muse On 2021’, a representative domestic musician nurturing project. ‘Muse On’ is The Ministry of Culture, Sports and Tourism and Korea Creative Content Agency representative musician development project that discovers promising musicians in Korea and helps them grow through various online and offline support programs. A total of 418 teams applied in 2021. As part of this project, Choi third digital single "Let's Get Well, We" was released on July 14, 2021. It's also Choi first remake album, where she rearranged the original song of singer Dark, lyricist Sung Yong-wook, composed by Jo Eun-young and Sung Yong-work.

The online performance 'MUSE ON Day' featured 3 teams of selected new musicians and 4 teams of guest musicians, and were held five times from July until November. Choi performed in MUSE ON Day No. 2 with Yunsae and Wi Ah-young on August 21, 2021.

In the second half of 2021, Choi finally had an opportunity to do her first television soundtrack. Her song Wish, was played as background music in the epilogue of episodes 5 and 6 of drama series Hometown Cha-Cha-Cha. was praised to be perfectly matched the mood of the scene, success in maximizing viewers' immersion. Choi who sung, wrote and composed the song herself, explained Wish as "a song that contains the heart of wanting to love and be loved in poverty, taking lightly the feelings that become heavy because of love." Stone Music Entertainment released Wish as single and instrumental track in Hometown Cha-Cha-Cha OST Part 4, album on September 25, 2021. With the song, Choi was nominated in Best OST at the 2021 Mnet Asian Music Awards.

On October 5, 2021, Choi released her fourth extended play (EP), "Journey" with double title track songs, "Live goes on" and "Took". The other three songs are, "The End", "Who are you?" and "Dejavu". Just few months later, Choi made a surprise comeback with the new digital single album "Journey Epilogue" on December 16, 2021. The concept was a conclusion of previous EP "Journey" and include a new song, "Enable".

In 2022, Choi Yu-ree was selected as one of six final winner of the 23rd Tune-Up musicians by CJ Azit with fellow musicians Kwak Tae-pung, Kim Jae-hyung, Yoon Ji-young, ID:Earth and Off the menu. From 727 musicians teams applied, 73 teams were selected in the first screening.

In March 2022, Choi contributed to the soundtrack for JTBC television series Thirty-Nine with song "That's All". The OST captures the heartbreaking feeling of Jung Chan-young (Jeon Mi-do), who's terminally ill and slowly preparing for a farewell with people she loves. It makes people realize the importance of present together with family and friends. Choi commented, "I can only do this all the time, but in fact, that's all I am, so it's no different from giving my all."

On May 3, 2022, Choi collaborated with Han Jae-wan, a composer from O'PEN music, in Shared Office Hookup OST "No Encore Request". The song was remake of song released in 2012 by indie band Broccoly, you too?. Expectations are high in that Choi Yu-ri's emotional voice and Lofi sound are combined to be reborn as a new version.

On May 26, 2022, Choi released her fifth mini-album, "To the Other Side of Greed". Five songs were recorded that contain Choi Yuri's warm story of her past regrets and her efforts to escape from her greed.

Choi contributed to the soundtrack for the television series drama Sh**ting Stars with single "Won't give up". Sh**ting Stars OST Part 5 was released on June in various online music sites. On top of the emotional acoustic sound, the lyrics seem to warmly soothe the tired heart of life and give listeners comfort.

In September 2021, Choi participated in the soundtrack for the television series drama If You Wish Upon Me with single "I'll Hide You in My Arms". The OST is a pop ballad song that begins with a gentle piano performance and continues with a heart-touching guitar performance. It contains a message of consolation that embraces the pain in the heart, telling all those who are going through hard days every day that they are never alone, and saying, 'It's okay if you don't do well, everything will pass'.

Through her various television soundtrack releases, Choi began to gain popularity.

Discography

Extended plays

Singles

Soundtrack appearances

Composing and songwriting 
Choi is registered as an songwriter with the Korea Music Copyright Association (KOMCA), with the registration number 10023084 and registration name  (Choi Yu-ree).

Filmography

Music Video

Radio

Television

Concert

Ambassadorship 
 Public Relations Ambassador of Pyeongchang-gun, Gangwon-do.

Accolades

Notes

References 

1998 births
Living people
South Korean women pop singers
21st-century South Korean women singers